The Comisión de Investigación de Accidentes Ferroviarios (CIAF) is an agency of the Spanish Government which investigates rail accidents. It is a division of the Ministry of Public Works and Transport. Its head office is in Madrid.

Investigated accidents
 
 Castelldefels train accident
 
 Santiago de Compostela derailment

See also

 Civil Aviation Accident and Incident Investigation Commission
 Standing Commission for Maritime Accident and Incident Investigations

References

External links
 Comisión de Investigación de Accidentes Ferroviarios 

Rail accident investigators
Government of Spain
Organisations based in Madrid
Transport in Madrid
2007 establishments in Spain